This is a list of regions of Ukraine by Human Development Index as of 2022 with data for the year 2021.

See also 
List of Ukrainian subdivisions by GDP per capita

References 

Human Development Index
Ranked lists of country subdivisions